Nathaniel Lande, born of Canadian parents, is a journalist, author, and filmmaker with a career spanning several decades. He is the author of ten books including Cricket and Dispatches from the Front: A History of the American War Correspondent, and was a creative force behind Time Inc. during his tenure.

The holder of two patents, he is credited for creating the Electronic Book and the Bookbank, a computerized electronic storage and retrieval system.

His most recent novel, While The Music Played, was released in May 2020 to critical acclaim, 
and the 10 Best of Everything is a bestseller for National Geographic Books.

Education
He was educated at the Avon Old Farms School, Duke University, Oxford University,  and earned his PhD at Trinity College Dublin in 1992. While a "Yank at Oxford", he and two classmates won an ARTS Council Award for their musical comedy, A Word With the Governor, a satire about the British Colonial Office. The play opened to rave reviews at the Oxford Playhouse, and then enjoyed a limited engagement at London's Lyric Hammersmith theatre.

As a professor, he has held appointments to the School of Journalism at the University of North Carolina at Chapel Hill; the Fuqua School of Business at Duke University, and Distinguished Scholar to Trinity College Dublin.

Career
His career spans publishing, television, and films. Creative Director for the Magazine Group, Time Inc., Director of Time World News Service, a founding director of Time-Life Films; executive producer for the CBS and NBC television networks; producer/director: Movies of the Week: CBS Cinema Center Films and Universal MCA.

At CBS he began his career in the mailroom, and soon was selected by the legendary Michael Dann and William Paley, to work for the head of Programming. Then he joined the producing staff of PM East, hosted by Mike Wallace, with Peter Lassally (who became producer of The Tonight Show at NBC).  By night, the young and enterprising producers searched for talent discovering Woody Allen at the Bon Soir, a small club in New York, and Barbra Streisand at One Fifth Avenue, and were the first to book them on national television.

While Creative Director for the Magazine Group at Time Inc., he innovated presentations for the publishers of the magazines writing musical revues: All About Life, One for the Money, and 10 the Musical, for Life, Money, and People magazines respectively. Each combined editorial content and publishing attributes. They were mini Broadway revues touring the country targeting advertisers. His creators included Scott Ellis and Susan Stroman, who became Broadway directors. Susan Stroman is best known for Contact and The Producers. As Director of Time World News Service, he broadcast Time stories to America and 70 countries around the world, writing and producing over 800 radio broadcasts.

Montage and Window on the World are two of the films and documentaries Nathaniel Lande wrote, produced and directed at Time, Inc., winning over 20 gold medals and international awards, including the New York and Cannes Film Festival With Gregory Peck, Lande served as a special White House aide under two United States Presidents. Part of his duties included producing White House events. His productions of Salute to Congress and a history of Presidential campaign songs called Sing Along with Millard Fillmore, starring  Walter Cronkite as narrator, were performed for the Congress.

Another innovation was adapting a motion stabilizing system to motion picture cameras, a technology used for gunnery sights on helicopters during the war in Vietnam, he found on assignment while making a documentary for Life magazine on helicopter warfare with photographer Larry Burrows, who was killed shortly after in Cambodia.   The lens won an Academy Award for Technology.

He is author of eleven books including two novels. His notable book Cricket is partly autobiographical, a coming of age story and triumph over a childhood handicap, received critical acclaim from The New York Times and Publishers Weekly. He and his central character Jonathan Landau could not speak for the first nine years of their lives.  The real Lande and fictional Landau made significant contributions to the first Special Olympics.

His other works include National Geographic The 10 Best of Everything, An Ultimate Guide for Travelers

Lande's novel, The Life and Times of Homer Sincere, Whose Amazing Adventures are Documented by his True and Trusted Friend Rigby Canfield, was released by Overlook Press in May 2010. The novel has been described as:  The novel has won praise from authors including Walter Isaacson, Homer Hickam, Selden Edwards,

Lande's latest book, While The Music Played, is a remarkable story of courage and friendship in WWII, and was released in May 2020 by Blackstone Publishing.

Bibliography
Mindstyles-Lifestyles, Price Stern Sloan
The Emotional Maintenance Manual, Rawson and Wade
The Morality and Responsibility of the Press, Time Inc.
Self Health, The Life Long Fitness Book, Holt, Rinehardt, Winston
Stages, Understanding How You Make Moral Decisions, Harper Collins
Cricket, A Novel, New American Library
Blueprinting, HarperCollins
Dispatches from the Front: A History of the American War Correspondent, Henry Holt.
Trade Paperback, Oxford University Press
The Cigar Connoisseur, Clarkson Potter
The Ten Best of Everything: Passport to the Best, An Ultimate Guide for Traveler, National Geographic Books
The Life and Times of Homer Sincere, Whose Amazing Adventures are Documented by his True and Trusted Friend Rigby Canfield, Overlook Press
While The Music Played, Blackstone Publishing
Spinning History: Politics and Propaganda in World War II, Skyhorse Publishing, Inc

References

External links
Official Authors Guild Site
Pen Profile
 

American inventors
American male writers
Duke University alumni
Living people
Year of birth missing (living people)
Avon Old Farms alumni